Indienne is a small village north of the port of Pointe Noire in the Republic of the Congo

Transport 

Indienne is the proposed site of a new deep water port for the export of iron ore.

South African miner Exxaro is looking at exporting up to 10mtpa of iron ore from the Port Indienne, including the construction of a 35 km rail spur to the existing Congo–Ocean Railway.

See also 
 Railway stations in Congo
 List of Panamax ports

References

External links 

Populated places in the Republic of the Congo